Nalvaravu is a 1964 Indian Tamil-language film directed by the duo Charlie–Maniam, produced by K. N. Natarajan and written by V. Lakshmanan. The film stars R. Muthuraman, Pushpalatha and E. V. Saroja. It was released on 5 March 1964.

Plot

Cast 
 R. Muthuraman
 Pushpalatha
 E. V. Saroja

Production 
Nalvaravu was directed by the duo Charlie–Maniam, produced by K. N. Natarajan under S. V. Movies, and written by Vidwan Ve. Lakshmanan. The final cut measured .

Themes 
The film deals primarily with divorce and remarriage.

Soundtrack 
The soundtrack was composed by T. Chalapathi Rao.

Release and reception 
Nalvaravu was released on 5 March 1964. The critic from The Indian Express said, "Rarely does one come across a movie which is bad in all aspects." T. M. Ramachandran of Sport and Pastime said the film provides "nothing but boredom for the cinegoers".

References

External links 
 

1960s Tamil-language films
1964 drama films
Films about divorce
Films about remarriage
Films scored by T. Chalapathi Rao
Indian drama films